Prickly City is a daily comic strip originally drawn by Scott Stantis, the editorial cartoonist for the Chicago Tribune, and distributed through United Features Syndicate. The cartoon follows the adventures of Carmen, a young girl of color, and a coyote pup named Winslow. The strip is frequently politically oriented with a conservative point-of-view.
It is currently drawn by Eric Allie.

Characters 
Carmen – a 'feisty' conservative and a Republican. For a brief time, she had a crush on Tucker Carlson. Carmen made her first appearance at least 4 months before the strip began, in one of Stantis's editorial cartoons.

Winslow – named for the town of Winslow, Arizona, is a coyote with political aspirations who acts patronizing, condescending and impulsive. His liberal responses are typically the source of the strip's jokes. Carmen is continuously frustrated by Winslow's assumption that she should be a liberal feminist. Early in the strip's run, Winslow had a crush on Condoleezza Rice, even writing a poem about her (which Carmen initially misunderstood as being a poem about herself).

Minor recurring characters

 Kevin, the Lost Bunny of the Apocalypse. Depending on the needs of the strip, he's alternately meant to evoke Barack Obama and Bill Clinton. He reports on signs of the "end times". In 2010, he was elected to the U.S. Senate under the banner of Winslow's "Lefty Tea Party".
 Hunny, Kevin's wife (also a bunny) and a prominent politician. Her character is a thinly veiled satire of Hillary Clinton.
 Dio, a chameleon named for Diogenes the Cynic. He was a campaign director for Winslow.
 Vaughn, appears to be an armadillo. He served as Winslow's campaign finance director.
 Rand, a vulture, possibly named after Rand Paul or Ayn Rand .

Controversies 

The Chicago Tribune refused to run the February 7, 2005 strip, which inaccurately quoted Ted Kennedy. According to Stantis, the syndicate erroneously added quote marks to the dialogue without his permission. Later that year The Seattle Times refused to run a series of strips about the Terri Schiavo case. Later, a series of strips beginning August 25, 2008 accused the attendees of the 2008 Democratic National Convention of being communists.

Tributes
Prickly City has paid tribute to the passing of famous people during 2006. On July 31, they paid tribute to Hooters president Robert H. Brooks. Frank and Ernest cartoonist Bob Thaves was remembered in the September 10, 2006 edition.

On September 16, 2019, the strip paid tribute to comics syndicate editor Lee Salem.

On February 13, 2021, the strip paid tribute to baseball player Hank Aaron.

Book collection

See also

 Mallard Fillmore – another conservative-themed comic strip

References

External links
 

American comic strips
Comics about politics
Conservative media in the United States